Walter J. Wetzel Triangle is small park bound by Cohancy Street, 156th Avenue, 99th Street, and 157th Avenue, in the Howard Beach neighborhood of Queens, New York City.

Walter 'Jo' Wetzel was born on September 16, 1944 and grew up in Howard Beach. An avid athlete, he attended the local grammar school (Our Lady of Grace) where he starred in both baseball and basketball. He also attended St. John's Preparatory School and Far Rockaway High School where he played varsity basketball.

After graduating from Far Rockaway High School, he worked briefly with the city's Parks Department. Wetzel was drafted into the Army in October 1965 and completed his training at Fort Dix, New Jersey before being deployed to Vietnam. He was the oldest of seven children, two of whom he never met. PFC Wetzel started his tour of Vietnam on May 8, 1966 and was killed in action 21 days later during the battle of LZ 10 Alpha. His remains were buried in Cypress Hills National Cemetery in Brooklyn. This .223-acre traffic triangle was named for Wetzel by Local Law 17 of 1977.

Triangular intersections that were too small to be developed were designated as public plazas, including this one. The park contains small hedges, trees, and a memorial flagpole honoring Wetzel and other local veterans.

See also
 List of New York City parks relating to the Vietnam War

References

Parks in Queens, New York
Squares in Queens, New York
Vietnam War monuments and memorials in the United States
Howard Beach, Queens